John Brenner may refer to:

 John Lewis Brenner (1832–1906), United States Representative from Ohio
 John Brenner (athlete) (born 1961), American track and field athlete
 John S. Brenner (born 1968), mayor of York, Pennsylvania
 John Brenner, singer and guitarist with Revelation
 John W.O. Brenner (1874–1962), Lutheran pastor and president of the Wisconsin Evangelical Lutheran Synod, 1933–1953
 Johnny Brenner (born 1971), Irish hurling player